Blood of the Condor is a 1969 Bolivian drama film co-written and directed by Jorge Sanjinés and starring Marcelino Yanahuaya. The film tells the story of an indigenous Bolivian community receiving medical care from the Peace Corps-like United States-backed agency Cuerpo del Progreso ("Progress Corps") which is secretly sterilising local women. The story, which was based on accounts by the indigenous people to the filmmaker, provoked an outrage in the public which led to a government investigation about the Peace Corps' actions in Bolivia, which ended in the expulsion of the agency from the country.

Plot summary 
An indigenous Bolivian community receiving medical care from the Peace Corps-like American agency Cuerpo del Progreso ("Progress Corps") which is secretly sterilising local women. The Bolivians attack the foreigners, and the attackers are rounded up and shot by the authorities. The brother of the shot protagonist desperately seeks medical care for his brother, but due to lack of money for proper care his brother dies.

Impact 
Sanjinés' Yawar Mallku is thought to have led to the expulsion of the Peace Corps from Bolivia in an act of anti-imperialist cultural nationalism by the indigenous people.

After showings of Yawar Mallku, Sanjinés learned that many peasants had criticism about the difficulty of his films due to the use of flashback for narration, as his film-making was greatly influenced by European art cinema, and about the lack of attention to denouncing the causes of the indigenous peoples' issues. He took this into account when making his next film, called :es:El coraje del pueblo ("The Courage of the People"), in 1971.

See also 

 Forced sterilization in Peru

Further reading 
 Revolutionary Cinema: The Bolivian Experience, Jorge Sanjinés. In: Julianna Burton (editor). Cinema and Social Change in Latin America: Conversations with Filmmakers. University of Texas Press, 1986. , 9780292724549

References

External links 
 

Bolivian drama films
1969 films
1969 in Bolivia
Films about genocide
Films about the Peace Corps
Films about racism
Sterilization in fiction
Films directed by Jorge Sanjinés
Quechua-language films
1960s English-language films
1960s Spanish-language films
1960s multilingual films